Chi Kraeng District is a district located in Siem Reap Province, in north-west Cambodia. According to the 1998 census of Cambodia, it had a population of 106,727.

Administrative divisions

References

Districts of Cambodia
Geography of Siem Reap province